Michael Anthony Jones (born April 14, 1960) is an American former gridiron football player and coach. He played professionally as wide receiver in the National Football League (NFL) for seven season with five different teams: the Minnesota Vikings (1983–1985), New Orleans Saints (1986–1987), Kansas City Chiefs (1988), New England Patriots (1989), and New Orleans Saints (1989). Jones played college football at Tennessee State University and returned to his alma mater to serve as offensive coordinator from 2010 to 2014.

Playing career
Born in Chattanooga, Tennessee, Jones graduated from Riverside High School in Chattanooga. He played college football at Tennessee State University. Jones then had a seven-year career as a National Football League wide receiver from 1983 to 1989, playing with the Minnesota Vikings and the New Orleans Saints.

Coaching career
Jones began his pro coaching career as an assistant coach with the Rhein Fire of NFL Europa.  As an assistant, he spent five years with the Fire in two spells, reaching the World Bowl on four occasions. From 1998 to 2000 he was the team's wide receivers coach, with the Rhein winning the league championship in 1998 and 2000.

Jones spent the 2001 season as an assistant with Galen Hall's Orlando Rage of the XFL.

After a one-year hiatus, Jones returned to the Fire as offensive coordinator in 2002. The Fire returned to the World Bowl in 2002 and 2003, losing to German rivals Berlin and Frankfurt.

Following Galaxy head coach Doug Graber's resignation following the 2003 season, Jones was named Graber's replacement.  In his four seasons as Frankfurt's head coach, Jones guided the team to the World Bowl three times, winning World Bowl XIV in 2006.  The league subsequently folded following the 2007 season.

On November 28, 2007, Jones was named head coach of Team Alabama of the All American Football League.  However, the league's inaugural season was postponed for financial reasons.

On February 2, 2009, Jones was named the receivers coach for the Toronto Argonauts of the Canadian Football League (CFL).

Personal life
Jones is married and has three children; his son Chandler Jones played college football at San Jose State and later went on to the CFL.

References

External links
 East Central CC profile
 Tennessee State profile
 Toronto Argonauts profile 
 

1960 births
Living people
American football wide receivers
Frankfurt Galaxy coaches
Minnesota Vikings players
New Orleans Saints players
Rhein Fire coaches
Tennessee State Tigers football coaches
Tennessee State Tigers football players
Toronto Argonauts coaches
Orlando Rage coaches
High school football coaches in Florida
Junior college football coaches in the United States
Sportspeople from Chattanooga, Tennessee
Coaches of American football from Tennessee
Players of American football from Tennessee
African-American coaches of American football
African-American players of American football
21st-century African-American people
20th-century African-American sportspeople